Lewis Williams, born  in Pentrebach, Merthyr Tydfil County Borough, Wales is a rugby union player for Pontypridd RFC in the Principality Premiership.

Williams joined Pontypridd from Merthyr RFC in 2008, and swiftly made a mark at Pontypridd as a fleet-footed winger, being called up to train with the Wales Sevens team in November 2008.

Williams' older brother Gavin is a midfielder with Merthyr Town.

His position of choice is at wing.

References

External links
Pontypridd RFC profile

1987 births
Living people
Pontypridd RFC players
Rugby union players from Merthyr Tydfil County Borough
Welsh rugby union players